Podospongiidae  is a family of sponges in the order Poecilosclerida.

Taxonomy
Diacarnus Burton, 1934
Diplopodospongia Sim-Smith & Kelly, 2011
Negombata de Laubenfels, 1936
Neopodospongia Sim-Smith & Kelly, 2011
Podospongia du Bocage, 1869
Sceptrintus Topsent, 1898
Sigmosceptrella Dendy, 1922

References

Poecilosclerida